Swiftex is an unincorporated community in Bastrop County, located in the U.S. state of Texas. It is located within the Greater Austin metropolitan area.

History
Swiftex was first known as Swiftex village when it was first built in the early 1940s. It became a military station for residents of nearby Camp Swift. There were 200 homes built in the community that disappeared as soon as the station closed after World War II. It continued to be featured on county maps in the 1980s, but there were no population estimates. Its name is a contraction of "Swift, Texas".

Geography

Education
The community of Swiftex is served by the Bastrop Independent School District.

References

Unincorporated communities in Bastrop County, Texas
Unincorporated communities in Texas